Citibank Canada, operating as Citi Canada, is the Canadian subsidiary of the American multinational financial services corporation Citigroup. Citi Canada is headquartered in Toronto, Ontario, with offices in Calgary, London, Ontario, Montreal, Mississauga, and Vancouver.

History

Citi Canada's Schedule 2 (foreign-owned, deposit-taking), under the Bank Act of Canada, subsidiary Citibank Canada is a member of the Canadian Bankers Association (CBA) and a member of the CDIC, a federal Crown corporation that insures deposits to applicable limits and across deposit categories.

Up until the finalization of the sale of its consumer finance subsidiary, CitiFinancial Canada, to affiliates of private equity firms J.C. Flowers & Co. and Värde Partners on April 3, 2017, the company engaged in consumer retail loans principally to sub-prime and near-prime borrowers. Both in the years preceding and subsequent to the sale transaction, CitiFinancial Canada, which was renamed Fairstone Financial, Inc. post-close, had 200 branches in Canada.

Products and services

The company provides securities trading, cash management, treasury, trade financing, custodial services, clearing, securities financing, depositary receipt, trust services, corporate banking, investment banking, private banking, and the private-label credit card of The Home Depot Canada. It had previously issued various MasterCard credit cards until Citi Canada sold that division (named Citi Cards Canada, Inc.) to CIBC in a $2.1 billion CAD deal in 2010.

See also

List of banks and credit unions in Canada

References

External links
 Citi Canada official website

Citigroup
Banks of Canada
Banks established in 1919
Banks established in 1954
Companies based in Toronto
Canadian subsidiaries of foreign companies